The 2013 Bowling Green Falcons football team represented Bowling Green State University in the 2013 NCAA Division I FBS football season. Through the 2013 MAC Championship Game, the Falcons were led by fifth-year head coach Dave Clawson. On December 10, Clawson left to become the new head coach at Wake Forest; the school named special teams coordinator Adam Scheier as interim head coach for the 2013 Little Caesars Pizza Bowl.

The Falcons played their home games at Doyt Perry Stadium. They were a member of the East Division of the Mid-American Conference.

Schedule

Game summaries

Tulsa

at Kent State

at Indiana

Murray State

Akron

Massachusetts

at Mississippi State

Toledo

at Miami (OH)

Ohio

at Eastern Michigan

at Buffalo

vs. Northern Illinois (MAC Championship Game)

vs. Pittsburgh (Little Caesars Pizza Bowl)

References

Bowling Green
Bowling Green Falcons football seasons
Mid-American Conference football champion seasons
Bowling Green Falcons football